Wendelin is an unincorporated community in Mercer County, in the U.S. state of Ohio.

History
A post office called Wendelin was established in 1883, and remained in operation until 1904. Besides the post office, Wendelin has a Catholic church.

References

Unincorporated communities in Mercer County, Ohio
Unincorporated communities in Ohio